California's 37th State Senate district is one of 40 California State Senate districts. It is currently represented by Democrat Dave Min of Irvine.

District profile 
The district encompasses central Orange County, centered on the city of Irvine. The district contains a mix of coastal beaches, suburban sprawl, and the Santa Ana Mountains.

Orange County – 31.2%
 Anaheim – 21.6%
 Costa Mesa
 Huntington Beach – 51.9%
 Irvine
 Laguna Beach
 Laguna Woods
 Lake Forest
 Newport Beach
 Orange – 92.6%
 Tustin
 Villa Park

Election results from statewide races

List of senators 
Due to redistricting, the 37th district has been moved around different parts of the state. The current iteration resulted from the 2011 redistricting by the California Citizens Redistricting Commission.

Election results 1992 - present

2020

2016

2015 (special)

2012

2010 (special)

2008

2004

2000

1996

1992

See also 
 California State Senate
 California State Senate districts
 Districts in California

References

External links 
 District map from the California Citizens Redistricting Commission

37
Government in Orange County, California
Government of Anaheim, California
Costa Mesa, California
Huntington Beach, California
Irvine, California
Lake Forest, California
Laguna Beach, California
Newport Beach, California
Orange, California
Tustin, California